Richard Fish may refer to:

Richard Fish (character), a character in the television series Ally McBeal
Richard Fish (politician) in 40th New York State Legislature
Richard Fish (actor), see List of Harry Potter cast members

See also
Richard Fish Cadle, American Episcopalian priest
Richard Fisk, fictional character
While Ricky Fish Was Sleeping, book published by David Lapham